Labone is a district of Accra, Ghana bounded to the south by Labadi Road.  Cantonments Road serves as the district's western boundary, while Labadi Crescent is the eastern boundary.  The Ring road separates Labone from the southern district of Osu.

As an extension of touristy Osu, Labone offers a mix of houses dating from the early 20th century.  Unlike Osu, however, Labone remains largely residential albeit with the siting of some embassies and corporate headquarters in the district.

Landmarks/places of interest 

 Labone Coffee shop
 Labone Senior High School
 South African Embassy

References 

Accra
Populated places in the Greater Accra Region